Anemoclema is a genus of flowering plants belonging to the family Ranunculaceae.

Its native range is Southern Central China.

Species:

Anemoclema glaucifolium

References

Ranunculaceae
Ranunculaceae genera